Uralungal Labor Contract Co-operative Society (ULCCS) is India’s oldest worker cooperative. Located in Calicut Kerala, it was established in 1925 by Palery Chandanman  with blessings from Vagbhadananda. The Uralungal Labor Contract Co-operative Society has close to 1415 members and has completed more than four thousand work projects. It undertakes the construction work for various government departments, such as Public Works Department, National Highway, Irrigation, and Tourism. ULCCS Charitable Foundation runs a training institute in Kozhikode for the neurodiverse.

The Uralungal Cooperative has undertaken over 1000 core projects, including the Kozhikode Sarovaram Project, city road improvement, the renovation of the Kappad Beach, the Kozhikode Arayidathupalam Bridge, the Iringa Craft Village, the Edasseri Kadavu Bridge and the Government Engineering College, Alappuzha, the six-laning project of NH66 from Talapady to Chengala reach of Kasaragod District.

History 
The origin dates back to the times when barbarism and superstition reigned. In Uralungal, Kozhikode district, where people used to live without jobs and wages, few villagers reached the temple complex at Puthalath in Mahe to hear the discourse of Vagbhatananda Guru. Impressed by the Guru's talk, who shared the Renaissance ideas, they invited Vagbhadananda to their homeland. In 1917, Palery formed a spiritual school under the leadership of a guru who arrived in the Karakkad region of Uralungal. No one in the country was given a job. The young men approached the Guru with sarcasm. The Guru said that this should not hinder the progress of the proceedings and suggested a simple solution: to start a cooperative group by organizing young people who are willing to work. Thus, on 13 February 1925, the Unemployed Mutual Assistance Group of Mercantile Workers registered a co-operative group called Uralungal Kooli Velakarude Paraspara Sahaya Sahakarana Pagham. This is the story behind the birth of the Uralungal Labor Contract Co-operative Society (ULCCS Ltd), which has transformed the face of Kerala by building major over-bridges, highways, and fly-overs.

The name of the village of Uralungal, a village in North Malabar, that no one knows about, was signed by Vagbhatanandan, one of the lamps of the Kerala Renaissance. The work undertaken by the Uralungal Society, in the beginning, was the construction of a fence, a small wall, and a well. The Guru had already strictly stated that the aim was not to make a profit. The ULCCS says that these workers are the beneficiaries of today's upliftment, ensuring quality, free of corruption and discipline. Says Chairman Paleri Rameshan. It was a time when the railway's Overbridge at Chorodu along the national highway, until then the ULCCSS had been confined to the Vadakara taluk and adjoining areas, taking only minor road contracts. The contract for the road to the Chorodu overbridge on the Vadakara-Thalassery highway was taken. At the time, the firm did not have the necessary equipment and equipment to perform the big contract work. The undertaking of a six-crore construction project in 1999 was a turning point in the growth of the worker cooperative. ULCCS did not even have its engineer but completed the work in due time and in good standing. All began to know the name of Uralungal. The movement did not have to seek contract work again. A large number of government and private sector construction workers came to Uralungal. To ensure quality and punctuality, the job has become a hiring process. Uralungal was also responsible for acquiring some private companies and completing ten-fifteen years' worth of work that was halfway completed.

References

Worker cooperatives of India
1925 establishments in India
Companies based in Kozhikode